Scott syndrome is a rare congenital bleeding disorder that is due to a defect in a platelet mechanism required for blood coagulation.

Normally when a vascular injury occurs, platelets are activated and phosphatidylserine (PS) in the inner leaflet of the platelet membrane is transported to the outer leaflet of the platelet membrane, where it provides a binding site for plasma protein complexes that are  involved in the conversion of prothrombin to thrombin, such as factor VIIIa-IXa (tenase) and factor Va-Xa (prothrombinase).

In Scott syndrome, the mechanism for translocating PS to the platelet membrane is defective, resulting in impaired thrombin formation. A similar defect in PS translocation has also been demonstrated in Scott syndrome red blood cells and Epstein–Barr virus transformed lymphocytes, suggesting that the defect in Scott syndrome reflects a mutation in a stem cell that affects multiple hematological lineages.

The basis for the defect in PS translocation is, at present, unknown. A candidate protein, scramblase, that may be involved in this process appears to be normal in Scott syndrome platelets. Other possible defects in PS translocation, reported in some patients, require further study. The initially reported patient with Scott Syndrome has been found to have a mutation at a splice-acceptor site of the gene encoding anoctamin 6 (ANO6, transmembrane protein 16F, TMEM16F). At present, the only treatment for episodes of bleeding is the transfusion of normal platelets.

References

Further reading
 Heemskerk JWM, Bevers EM, Lindhout T. Platelet activation and blood coagulation, Thromb Haem 2002; 88:186–194
 Martinez MC, Martin S, Toti F, Fressinaud E, Dachary-Prigent J, Meyer D, et al. Significance of capacitative Ca2+ entry to the regulation of phosphatidylserine expression at the surface of stimulated cells. Biochemistry 1999; 38:10092–10098
 Munnix ICA, Harmsma M, Diddings JC, Collins PW, Feijge P, Comfurius JWM, et al. Store-mediated Ca2+ entry in the regulation of phoshatidylserine exposure in blood cells from Scott patients. Thromb Haemost 2003; 89:687–695
 Weiss HJ, Vicic WJ, Lages BA, Rogers J. Isolated deficiency of platelet procoagulant activity. Am J Med 1979; 67:206–213
 Miletich JP, Kane WH, Hofmann SL, Stanford N, Majerus PW. Deficiency of factor Xa-factor Va binding sites on the platelets of a patient with a bleeding disorder. Blood 1979; 54:1015–1022
 Bevers EM, Wiedmer T, Comfurius P, Shattil SJ, Weiss HJ, Zwaal RFA, et al. Defective Ca2+ induced microvesiculation and deficient expression of procoagulant activity in erythrocytes from a patient with a bleeding disorder:  a study of the red blood cells of Scott syndrome. Blood 1992;79:380–388
 Kojima H, Newton-Nash D, Weiss HJ, Sims PJ, Zhao J, Wiedmer T. Production and characterization of transformed B-lymphocytes expressing the membrane defect of Scott Syndrome. J Clin Invest 1994; 94:2237–2244
 Stout JG, Basse F, Luhm RA, Weiss HJ, Wiedmer T, Sims PJ. Scott syndrome erythrocytes contain a membrane protein capable of mediating Ca2+-dependent transbilayer migration of membrane phospholipids. J Clin Invest 1997; 99:2232–2238
 Albrecht C, McVey JH, Elliott JI, Sardini A, Kasza I, Mumford AD, et al. A novel missense mutation in ABCA1 results in altered protein trafficking and reduced phosphatidylserine translocation in a patient with Scott syndrome. Blood 2005; 106:542–549
 Brooks MB, Catalfamo JL, Alex Brown H, Ivanova P, Lovaglio J. A hereditary bleeding disorder of dogs caused by a lack of platelet procoagulant activity. Blood 2002; 99:2434–2441

External links 

Genetic disorders with no OMIM
Coagulopathies
Rare diseases
Syndromes